Élie Diodati (Elia, Elias) (1576–1661) was a Genevan lawyer and jurist from a leading Calvinist family in Geneva, who had moved there from Lucca. He is now known as a supporter of Galileo: they started their correspondence in 1620 and met in Florence in 1626.

He settled in Paris, where he was an avocat du Parlement. He arranged for Lodewijk Elzevir to visit Galileo at Arcetri, in May 1636, leading to the publication of the Two New Sciences.

Notes

Further reading
Maurice A. Finocchiaro, Retrying Galileo, 1633-1992 (2005 translation)
Stéphane Garcia (2004), Élie Diodati et Galilée: Naissance d'un réseau scientifique dans l'Europe du XVIIe siècle

Politicians from the Republic of Geneva
1576 births
1661 deaths
Lawyers from Geneva
17th-century French lawyers
 Calvinist and Reformed Christians